The wind machine (also called an aeoliphone or aelophon) is a friction idiophone used to produce the sound of wind for orchestral compositions and musical theater productions.

Construction 

The cylinder body of the instrument rests upon a stand and is typically covered with silk, canvas, or other material which is in a fixed position. A crank handle, used by the player to rotate the cylinder and create the sound, is attached to the cylinder.

Another method of construction implements an electric fan, which is fitted with lengths of cane, rather than blades. However, this method is less popular because it does not provide the player with the ability to control the speed of rotation.

Technique 

The wind machine is played by rotating the crank handle, which is attached to the cylinder, to create friction between the wooden slats and the material covering that touches the cylinder but does not rotate as the crank handle is turned. This friction between the wood and the material covering creates the sound of rushing wind. The volume and pitch of the sound is controlled by the rate at which the crank is turned. The faster the handle is turned, the higher the resulting pitch and the louder the sound. The slower the handle is turned, the lower the pitch and the softer the volume. The sound of the wind machine can also be controlled by the tightness of the fabric covering the cylinder.

Classical works that use the instrument 

Jean-Philippe Rameau: Les Boréades
Giacomo Puccini: La Fanciulla del West
Gioachino Rossini: The Barber of Seville
Richard Wagner: Der fliegende Holländer
Richard Strauss: Don Quixote, Eine Alpensinfonie (An Alpine Symphony), Josephslegende (1914), Die ägyptische Helena, and Die Frau ohne Schatten
Edward Elgar: The Starlight Express
Maurice Ravel: Daphnis et Chloé, L'enfant et les sortilèges, The orchestration version of Gaspard de la nuit - Scarbo
Gottfried Huppertz: "Chronicles of the Gray House"
Olivier Messiaen: Des canyons aux étoiles…, Saint François d'Assise and Éclairs sur l'au-delà…
Arnold Schoenberg: Die Jakobsleiter
Benjamin Britten: Noye's Fludde
Gyorgy Ligeti: Le Grand Macabre
Ralph Vaughan Williams: Sinfonia antartica
Ferde Grofé: Grand Canyon Suite
Jerry Goldsmith: The Blue Max
Fazıl Say: Symphony No 3 Universe
Michael Tippett: Symphony No. 4

References

External links 
 Demonstration of a Wind Machine by Dame Evelyn Glennie

Friction idiophones
Sound effects
Special effects